Zukiswa Wanner (born 1976) is a South African journalist, novelist and editor born in Zambia and now based in Kenya. Since 2006, when she published her first book, her novels have been shortlisted for awards including the South African Literary Awards (SALA) and the Commonwealth Writers' Prize. In 2015, she won the K Sello Duiker Memorial Literary Award for London Cape Town Joburg (2014). In 2014, Wanner was named on the Africa39 list of 39 Sub-Saharan African writers aged under 40 with potential and talent to define trends in African literature. In 2020, she was awarded the Goethe Medal alongside Ian McEwan and Elvira Espejo Ayca, making Wanner the first African woman to win the award.

Life and career
Zukiswa Wanner was born in 1976 in Lusaka, Zambia, to a South African father and a Zimbabwean mother. After receiving primary and secondary education in Zimbabwe, she studied for a degree in journalism at Hawaii Pacific University in Honolulu.

Her debut novel, The Madams, was published in 2006 and has been called "a racy and hilarious take on the black economic empowerment crowd in Johannesburg". It was shortlisted for the K Sello Duiker Award of the South African Literary Awards (SALA) in 2007. She went on to write three other novels: Behind Every Successful Man (2008), Men of the South (2010), which was shortlisted for the 2011 Commonwealth Writers' Prize (Africa region), as well as the Herman Charles Bosman Award, and 2014's London Cape Town Joburg, which won the K Sello Duiker Memorial Literary Award in 2015.

In 2010, she co-authored two works of non-fiction: with South African photographer Alf Kumalo A Prisoner's Home, a biography on the first Mandela house 8115 Vilakazi Street, and L'Esprit du Sport with French photographer Amelie Debray. Wanner is co-editor of the African-Asian short-story anthology Behind the Shadows (2012) with Rohini Chowdhury. In addition Wanner has written two children's books, Jama Loves Bananas and Refilwe – an African retelling of the fairy tale "Rapunzel". In 2018, her third nonfiction work Hardly Working, a travel memoir, was published by Black Letter Media.

She was one of 66 writers to write a contemporary response to the Bible, the works being staged at the Bush Theatre and at Westminster Abbey in October 2011.

She is a founding member of the ReadSA initiative, a campaign encouraging South Africans to read South African works. She also sat on the pan-African literary initiative, Writivism's Board of Trustees until September 2016. She is a regular participant at international literary events and has conducted workshops for young writers in Zimbabwe, South Africa, Denmark, Germany and Western Kenya.

In 2015 Wanner was also one of three judges of the Etisalat Prize for Literature, a Pan-African literary prize for book-length fiction, and she was the African juror for the Commonwealth Short Story Prize 2017. She has also been the founder and curator of Artistic Encounters in Nairobi, Kenya. In 2020, in response to the COVID-19 lockdown she founded and curated the Afrolit Sans Frontieres Festival, which first took place on 23 March via Facebook and Instagram, with further editions being held subsequently. The festival has featured prominent African writers including Maaza Mengiste, Fred Khumalo, Chris Abani, Yvonne Adhiambo Owuor, Shadreck Chikoti, Abubakar Adam Ibrahim, Mũkoma wa Ngũgĩ, Jennifer Nansubuga Makumbi, Mona Eltahawy, Nii Ayikwei Parkes, Sulaiman Addonia, Chike Frankie Edozien, and Lola Shoneyin, among others.

In 2018, Wanner set up her publishing company, Paivapo, in partnership with her friend and businessperson Nomavuso Vokwana, with a focus on marketing African literature in the Anglophone, Francophone and Lusophone African regions.

A prolific journalist, essayist and short-story writer, she has been a contributor to a wide range of newspapers and magazines, including The Observer/The Guardian, Sunday Independent, City Press, Mail & Guardian, La Republica, Open Society, The Sunday Times, African Review, New Statesman, True Love, Marie Claire, Real, Juice, OpenSpace, Wordsetc, Baobab, Shape, Oprah, Elle, Juice, Guernica, Afropolitan and Forbes Africa. Her short story "This is not Au Revoir" is included in the 2019 anthology New Daughters of Africa, edited by Margaret Busby.

Wanner currently lives in Nairobi, Kenya, having visited for the first time in 2008 and moved there three years later.

Awards and honours 
In April 2014, Wanner was named on the Hay Festival's Africa39 list of 39 Sub-Saharan African writers aged under 40 with potential and talent to define trends in African literature.

In July 2014, she was chosen for "Twenty in 20", an initiative to select twenty works of fiction considered as South Africa's best literature since 1994 best stories in South African literature.

In 2015, at the South African Literary Awards (SALA), she won the K Sello Duiker Memorial Literary Award for her novel London Cape Town Joburg (2014).

In 2020, Wanner was awarded the Goethe Medal, a yearly prize given by the Goethe-Institut honouring non-Germans "who have performed outstanding service for the German language and for international cultural relations".

In December 2020, she was chosen by Brittle Paper as "African Literary Personality of the Year".

Bibliography

Novels
 The Madams, Oshun Books, 2006. 
 Behind Every Successful Man, Kwela Books, 2008. 
 Men of the South, Kwela Books, 2010. 
 London Cape Town Joburg, Kwela Books, 2014.

Non-fiction
 8115: A Prisoner's Home with Alf Kumalo, Penguin, 2010
 Maid in SA: 30 Ways to Leave Your Madam, Jacana, 2010. 
 Hardly Working: A Travel Memoir of Sorts, Black Letter Media, 2018.

Children's books
 Jama Loves Bananas, Jacana, 2013
 Refilwe (an African retelling of "Rapunzel"), Jacana, 2014.

As editor
 With Rohini Chowdhury, Behind The Shadows. Contemporary Stories from Africa and Asia (2012)

References

External links
 Zukiswa Wanner official website
 Ambrose Musiyiwa, Zukiswa Wanner: Interview 1, Conversations with Writers, November 2008.
 Janet van Eeden, "Zukiswa Wanner, author of Men of the South", LitNet, 17 August 2010.
 "Reading 2010: Zukiswa Wanner (South Africa)", Wealth of Ideas, 1 February 2011.
 "In a Conversation with South African Writer, Zukiswa Wanner", Geosi Reads, 17 February 2011.
 Ambrose Musiyiwa, Zukiswa Wanner: Interview 2, Conversations with Writers, 19 February 2011.
 Kiprop Kimutai, "The Jalada Conversations No 4: Zukiswa Wanner", Jalada, a pan-African writers' collective, 30 November 2015.
 Exclusive to The JRB: I'm going to market the hell out of our stories' —Zukiswa Wanner reveals the details of her new Africa-focused publishing company, Paivapo", The Johannesburg Review of Books, 19 April 2017.
 Page 19': A border tale of visas and Eastern Europe by Zukiswa Wanner". Johannesburg Review of Books, 2 October 2017.

 Martina Bertram, "Zukiswa Wanner: Autocratic governments oppose reading citizens", DW, 29 October 2021.

1976 births
21st-century essayists
21st-century South African novelists
21st-century South African women writers
Hawaii Pacific University alumni
Living people
South African children's writers
South African journalists
South African women children's writers
South African women journalists
South African women novelists
South African women short story writers